Outside Closer is the sixth studio album by Hood. It was released on Domino Recording Company on 17 January 2005.

Critical reception

At Metacritic, which assigns a weighted average score out of 100 to reviews from mainstream critics, the album received an average score of 80, based on 27 reviews, indicating "generally favorable reviews".

No Ripchord placed it at number 14 on the "Top 50 Albums of 2005" list.

Track listing

Personnel
Credits adapted from liner notes.

 Hood – music, production, mixing, photography, sleeve design
 I. Haywood – additional drums (3)
 Nicola Hodgkinson – vocals
 Andrew Johnson – vocals
 G. S. Brown – piano, keyboards
 M. Wright – flute, clarinet
 E. Marcasi – trumpet, horns
 Omar Puente – viola
 Choque Hosein – percussion, production, recording, mixing
 C. Adams – recording
 Richard Formby – additional recording
 Julian Scott Wellington – additional recording
 Dallas – mastering
 Matt Cooper – sleeve design

References

External links
 
 

2005 albums
Hood (band) albums
Domino Recording Company albums
Glitch (music) albums
Experimental pop albums